is a Japanese manga series written and illustrated by Asato Mizu. It began serialization in Shueisha's Shōnen Jump+ service in January 2017, and has been compiled into fourteen tankōbon volumes. An anime television series adaptation by Felix Film aired from April to June 2022 on the Animeism programming block.

Premise
In his first year of high school, making friends is not so easy for Raido Matsuboshi. One day in class, Raido tries to talk to his classmate next to him and thinks she is ignoring him, but later realizes she was shunned by her previous classmates for being clingy, awkward, and timid. Raido decides to help said classmate, Reina Aharen, to come out of her shell and befriend her for whatever it takes, and in turn coming out of his own rather odd shell.

Characters

Media

Manga

Anime
An anime television series adaptation was announced on July 31, 2021. The series was produced by Felix Film and was directed by Tomoe Makino, with Yasutaka Yamamoto serving as chief director, Takao Yoshioka overseeing the scripts, Yūko Yahiro designing the characters, and Satoru Kōsaki and MONACA composing the music. It aired from April 2 to June 18, 2022, on the Animeism programming block on MBS, TBS, and BS-TBS. Crunchyroll has licensed the series.

On April 11, 2022, Crunchyroll announced that the series would receive an English dub, which premiered on April 15.

Episode list

See also
Denkigai no Honya-san – Another manga series by the same author

Notes

References

External links
  
  
 

2017 manga
2022 anime television series debuts
Anime series based on manga
Animeism
Crunchyroll anime
Felix Film
Japanese webcomics
Romantic comedy anime and manga
Shōnen manga
Shueisha manga
Webcomics in print